Eyüp is a district of the city of Istanbul, Turkey.

Eyüp is a Turkish name and may also refer to:

People
 Eyüp (given name)

Places
 Eyüp, a district of Istanbul, Turkey 
 Eyüplü, Saimbeyli, a village in Saimbeyli district of Adana Province, Turkey

Other uses
 Eyüpspor, the football team of the district of Eyüp
 Eyüp Cemetery, a historic large burial ground in Eüp district of Istanbul, Turkey
 Eyüp Gondola, a two-station gondola lift line in Eyüp, Istanbul
 Eyüp Sultan Mosque, a mosque in Eyüp district of Istanbul, Turkey